is a Japanese football player. He plays for FC Maruyasu Okazaki.

Playing career
Haruki Umemura joined to Kataller Toyama in 2014. In July 2015, he moved to Maruyasu Okazaki. In 2016, he backed to Kataller Toyama.

Club statistics
Updated to 23 February 2018.

References

External links
Profile at Kataller Toyama

1995 births
Living people
Association football people from Shizuoka Prefecture
Japanese footballers
J2 League players
J3 League players
Japan Football League players
Kataller Toyama players
FC Maruyasu Okazaki players
J.League U-22 Selection players
Association football midfielders